Hidalgoa ternata is a flowering plant in the tribe Coreopsideae of the family Asteraceae. It is found in areas of the tropics in the Americas.

Distribution
The plant is native to southern Mexico, Central America, and northwestern South America.

It is common in montane cloud forests in Costa Rica, such as in the Monteverde Cloud Forest Reserve.

Description
Hidalgoa ternata is a hemi-epiphytic vine.

It is distinguished by its deep orange flowers and ternate leaves.

References

External links

Missouri Botanical Garden|eol.org: bibliography of published literature on Hidalgoa ternata — with online links.

Coreopsideae
Epiphytes
Vines
Flora of Chiapas
Flora of Oaxaca
Flora of Tabasco
Flora of Veracruz
Flora of Puebla
Flora of Colombia
Flora of Costa Rica
Flora of Ecuador
Flora of Guatemala
Flora of Panama
Flora of Peru